This is a list of players who played at least one game for the Indianapolis Racers of the World Hockey Association (WHA) from the 1974–75 to 1978.



A
Ray Adduono
Steve Andrascik
Bob Ash

B
Bryon Baltimore
Bill Blackwood
Ken Block
Kerry Bond
Gary Bredin
Andy Brown
Ron Buchanan
Randy Burchell
Don Burgess

C
Bryan Campbell
Kim Clackson
Brian Coates
Charles Constantin
Roger Cote
Glenn Critch

D
Ken Desjardine
Kevin Devine
Michel Dion
Dave Dornseif
Peter Driscoll
Michel Dubois
Ed Dyck

F
Bob Fitchner
Dave Fortier
Rick Fraser
John French

G
Wes George
Bill Goldsworthy
Bruce Greig
Wayne Gretzky

H
Craig Hanmer
Nick Harbaruk
Joe Hardy
Jim Hargreaves
Hugh Harris
Murray Heatley
Paul Hoganson
Leif Holmqvist
Ralph Hopiavuori
Bill Horton
John Hughes

I
Dave Inkpen
Gary Inness
Glen Irwin

J
Jim Johnson
Bob Jones

K
Gordon Kannegiesser
Al Karlander
Murray Kennett
Dave Keon

L
Claude Larose
Don Larway
Rene LeClerc
Rich Leduc
Gerry Leroux
Jacques Locas
Mark Lomenda

M
Blair MacDonald
Gary MacGregor
Dean Magee
Darryl Maggs
Gilles Marotte
Larry Mavety
Brian McDonald
Peter McDuffe
Brian McKenzie
Al McLeod
Mark Messier
Eddie Mio
Angie Moretto
Kevin Morrison
Dave Morrow

N
Kevin Nugent

P
Rosaire Paiement
Michel Parizeau
Jim Park
Ed "Rusty" Patenaude
Gene Peacosh
Lynn Powis
Bill Prentice
Dick Proceviat
Rich Pumple

R
Brad Rhiness
Steve Richardson
Joe Robertson
Frank Rochon
Jerry Rollins
Bob Roselle

S
Larry Sacharuk
Ted Scharf
Bobby Sheehan
John Sheridan
Bob Sicinski
Dale Smedsmo
Gary Smith
Ross Smith
Frank Spring
Claude St. Sauveur
Pat Stapleton
Blaine Stoughton

T
Reg Thomas

W
Ron Walters
Bob Whitlock
Barry Wilkins
Jim Wiste
Bob Woytowich
Randy Wyrozub

Z
Mike Zuke

See also
 List of NHL players

External links
 Hockeydb.com

Indiana sports-related lists
Lists of WHA players